Ron Steele (born 19 August 1953) is an American former ski jumper who competed in the 1972 Winter Olympics.

References

1953 births
Living people
American male ski jumpers
Olympic ski jumpers of the United States
Ski jumpers at the 1972 Winter Olympics
Place of birth missing (living people)